The 2017 Asian Youth Netball Championship was the 10th edition of the tournament. The tournament was played at Jeonju, South Korea from 6 May to 13 May with ten Asian national netball teams.

Singapore defeated Malaysia 47–43 in the final to win the championship.

Teams

Preliminary round
All times are in Korea Standard Time (UTC+09:00). Points allocated will be 2 points for a win, 1 point for a draw, 0 for a loss and -2 for a walkover.

Group A

Group B

Classification round

Ninth to tenth place classification

Ninth and tenth place

Fifth to eighth place classification

Bracket

Crossover

Seventh and eighth place

Fifth and sixth place

First to fourth place classification

Bracket

Semi-finals

Third and fourth place

Final

Final standings

References

External links
NetballAsia Facebook event

Asian Netball Championship
Netball
Asia
International netball competitions hosted by South Korea